St. James' Cemetery is a historic cemetery in Toronto, Ontario, Canada. It is the oldest cemetery in Toronto that is still in use, having opened in 1844. It was originally the burial ground for the Cathedral Church of St. James, but it later became non-denominational. The main entrance to the cemetery is located at 635 Parliament Street, north of Wellesley Street East. Just to the west is the St. James Town neighbourhood, which is named after the cemetery.

History

The cemetery opened in July 1844 for the burial of people professing the Anglican faith. At that time, most of the city's population of 18,000 lived south of Queen Street West, and the cemetery's location was regarded during that era as being outside the city limits. The cemetery was necessary because the burial ground around the cathedral itself, in use since 1797, was out of room.

The large, impressive specimen of Copper Beech that grows next to the chapel was planted by the Prince of Wales (later King Edward VIII) on his visit to Canada in 1919.

Recognizing the growing trend throughout the world towards cremation, a crematorium was added in 1948. As of 2020, over 95,000 interments and 114,000 cremations have taken place at the cemetery.

The cemetery is home to the Chapel of St. James-the-Less, which sits atop a knoll at the highest point of the cemetery. In its harmonious composition, this small funeral chapel is a splendid example of Victorian Gothic design. Its sense of strength and spirituality is derived from the subtle contrast of its stone walls, enveloping roofs, and soaring spire. Erected in 1860 and opened in 1861, the chapel was designed by Cumberland and Storm, one of Toronto's leading 19th-century architectural firms. The Chapel of St. James-the-Less was designated a National Historic Site of Canada in 1990.

Notable interments

 Graeme Mercer Adam, author, editor, and publisher
 James Austin, founder of The Dominion Bank (predecessor of the Toronto Dominion Bank)
 Maurice Baldwin, Anglican Bishop
 Robert Baldwin, Joint Premier of the Province of Canada
 George Anthony Barber, Toronto's first school superintendent
 William Henry Beatty, lawyer and businessman
 Charles Albert Berczy, postmaster for Toronto
 Edward Blake, second premier of Ontario
 Samuel Hume Blake, lawyer and judge.  Brother of Edward Blake
 Hampden Zane Churchill Cockburn, Victoria Cross recipient in the Second Boer War
 James Cockburn, Father of Confederation
 Hannah Grier Coome, founder of Sisterhood of St. John the Divine; Anglican Church of Canada saint
 Sophia Dalton, newspaper publisher
 Francis Collier Draper, Chief Constable of Toronto
 Alfred Hutchinson Dymond, writer and politician
 William Glenholme Falconbridge, lawyer and judge
 George Gooderham and William Gooderham, Sr., whiskey magnates (see Gooderham and Worts)
 George Goulding, Olympic athlete
 James Grand, businessman and co-founder of Grand & Toy office supply chain
 H. J. Grasett, Toronto police chief from 1886 to 1920
 Casimir Gzowski, engineer and railway builder
 Peter Gzowski, broadcaster
 John Hawkins Hagarty, lawyer, teacher, and judge
 Esther Frances How, educator
 William Pearce Howland, Father of Confederation
 Edward James Gibson Holland, recipient of the Victoria Cross; cremated at St. James Cemetery
 Aemilius Irving, lawyer
 Andrew Scott Irving, bookseller and publisher
 Robert Sympson Jameson, lawyer and politician
 Winnifred Kingsford, sculptor and teacher
 E. J. Lennox, architect of Casa Loma and Old City Hall
 Alexander Manning, contractor, businessman, and the 20th Mayor of Toronto
 Clara Brett Martin, lawyer
 John J. McLaughlin, founder of Canada Dry
 Francis Henry Medcalf, millwright, iron founder, and Mayor of Toronto
 William Ralph Meredith, politician
 Wallace Nesbitt, lawyer and puisne justice of the Supreme Court of Canada
 Abe Orpen, owner of racetracks, casino operator, businessman
 Marjorie Pickthall, writer
 James Henry Plummer, financier and businessperson
 Franklin Bates Polson, machinist, engineer and shipbuilder
 Jackie Rae, singer, songwriter and television performer; uncle of Bob Rae and brother of diplomat Saul Rae
 David Breakenridge Read, lawyer, educator, author, and Mayor of Toronto
 John P. Robarts, 17th Premier of Ontario
 John Robinson, lawyer, judge and political
 Henry Scadding, historian
 John Scarlett, developer
 Goldwin Smith, historian and journalist
 William Thomas, architect
 Christopher Widmer, physician and surgeon
 Daniel Wilson (academic)

War graves
The cemetery contains the war graves of 42 Commonwealth service personnel, 16 from each of the two World Wars.

References

Bibliography
 Jones, Donald. "Tombs of Toronto's first families. A walk in St. James' Cemetery recalls the pageantry in our past." Toronto Star. Toronto: October 2, 1993. Section C, p. G-8.

External links

 
 
 Chapel of St. James-the-Less National Historic Site of Canada
 

Cemeteries in Toronto
Anglican cemeteries in Canada